Leiker is a surname. Notable people with the surname include:

Jeff Leiker (born 1962), American community college sports administrator, and football player and coach
Tony Leiker (born 1964), American football player

See also
Granuloma multiforme
Leikert